The name Kompasu has been used to name four tropical cyclones in the northwestern Pacific Ocean. The name was contributed by Japan and is the Japanese word for Compass (Circinus).

 Tropical Storm Kompasu (2004) (T0409, 12W, Julian) - Struck Hong Kong
 Typhoon Kompasu (2010) (T1007, 08W, Glenda) - Skirted Okinawa before making landfall in Seoul, South Korea.
 Tropical Storm Kompasu (2016) (T1611, 13W) - Struck Japan
 Tropical Storm Kompasu (2021) (T2118, 24W, Maring) 

Pacific typhoon set index articles